London Buses route 406 is a Transport for London contracted bus route in London and Surrey, England. Running between Kingston and Epsom, it is operated by London United.

History
Route 406 started in 1920 as route S6 between Kingston and Redhill, and was renumbered as 406 in 1924. In 1957, the second prototype AEC Routemaster ran on route 406 between Redhill and Kingston. It was later shortened to operate just between Kingston and Epsom. Following the Privatisation of London bus services the route became part of London Country South West. In 1991,the route was diverted at Surbiton Hill Road via Surbiton Station to Kingston.

On 27 January 2001 it became a tendered Transport for London route with London United's Hounslow garage taking over operation. A proposal to extend the 406 to Teddington in 2001 was not received favourably by residents and did not proceed.

Upon being re-tendered, on 30 June 2007 it passed to Quality Line with new Alexander Dennis Enviro400s. It was the first double deck contract won by Quality Line. The route was diverted via Surbiton Hill Road instead of Surbiton station at the same time. Thus the route was restored to its original routing.

In 2016 a petition was launched calling for the route to run overnight.

On 24 April 2020, Route 406 along with Route 418 and 465 were transferred to London United operating from their Tolworth Depot.

Current route
Route 406 operates via these primary locations:

Kingston Cromwell Road bus station for Kingston station 
Surbiton Hollyfield School
Tolworth Broadway
Tolworth station 
Ewell High Street
High Street for Epsom station 
Epsom Clock Tower or Hospital

References

External links

Bus routes in London
Transport in Epsom and Ewell
Transport in the Royal Borough of Kingston upon Thames